A condemned prisoner's last meal is a customary ritual preceding execution. In many countries, the prisoner may, within reason, select what the last meal will be.

Contemporary restrictions in the United States
In the United States, most states give the meal a day or two before execution and use the euphemism "special meal". Alcohol or tobacco are usually, but not always, denied. Unorthodox or unavailable requests are replaced with similar substitutes. Some states place tight restrictions. Sometimes, a prisoner asks to share the last meal with another inmate (as Francis Crowley did with John Resko in 1932) or has the meal distributed among other inmates (as requested by Raymond Fernandez in 1951).

In Florida, the food for the last meal must be purchased locally and the cost is limited to $40. In Oklahoma, the cost is limited to $25. In Louisiana, the prison warden traditionally joins the condemned prisoner for the last meal. On one occasion, the warden paid for an inmate's lobster dinner.

In Texas, the tradition of customized last meals is thought to have been established around 1924, but in September 2011, the state of Texas abolished all special meal requests after condemned prisoner Lawrence Russell Brewer requested a large and expensive last meal, but did not eat any of it, stating that he was not hungry. Since then, the prisoner's last meal is whatever is being served in the Huntsville Unit cafeteria on the day of execution.

Documented last meal requests
This represents the items requested, as reported, but does not in all cases represent what the prisoner actually received.

Europe

Asia

Canada

United States

California

Alabama

Texas

Before 2011

After 2011

Other states

See also

 Capital punishment
 Death row
 Final statement
 Last Supper
 Religion and capital punishment

References

Further reading 
 Treadwell, Ty and Vernon, Michelle (2011) Last Suppers: Famous Final Meals from Death Row

External links 
 Greene, Bob (12 June 2001). They didn't get to choose their last meals. Jewish World Review. Retrieved on 2007-08-17.
 Karon, Tony (10 August 2000). Why We're Fascinated by Death Row Cuisine. TIME Magazine. Retrieved on 2007-08-17.
 Stein, Joel (18 October 2007). You Eat What You Are. TIME Magazine. Retrieved on 2007-11-11.
 Famous Last Meals. Portraits of Last Requests. Retrieved on 2010-09-17.
 Final Meal Requests. Texas Department of Criminal Justice (12 September 2003). Archived from the original on 2003-12-02. Retrieved on 2011-03-17.
 Last Meals. rotten dot com. Retrieved on 2007-08-17.
 Last Meals: What Would You Order? Seattle Weekly (18 June 2010). Retrieved on 2010-06-24.
 Last Meals on Death Row (since 2002). Dead Man Eating. Retrieved on 2007-08-17.
 Top 10 Death Row Last Meal Requests from Texas . Zombie Popcorn (9 October 2008) Retrieved on 2010-09-29.

Capital punishment
Death customs
Meals
Prison food